Vyacheslav Miranovich Ambartsumyan (22 June 1940 – 4 January 2008) was a Soviet footballer.  A native of Moscow, he played midfielder and forward.  He died in 2008 at the age of 67 after being hit by a car in Moscow.

Honours
 Soviet Top League winner: 1969.
 Soviet Cup winner: 1963, 1965, 1971.

International career
Ambartsumyan made his debut for USSR on 10 September 1961 in a friendly against Austria. He also played in a 1962 FIFA World Cup qualifier against Turkey.

External links and references
  Profile 
  Rambler

1940 births
2008 deaths
Soviet footballers
Soviet Armenians
Soviet Union international footballers
Pedestrian road incident deaths
FC Spartak Moscow players
PFC CSKA Moscow players
Soviet Top League players
Road incident deaths in Russia
Association football forwards
Association football midfielders